The Department of Education, Training and Youth Affairs was an Australian government department that existed between October 1998 and November 2001.

Scope
Information about the department's functions and/or government funding allocation could be found in the Administrative Arrangements Orders, the annual Portfolio Budget Statements, in the Department's annual reports and on the Department's website.

According to the Administrative Arrangements Order (AAO) made on 21 October 1998, the Department dealt with:
Education, other than migrant education 
Youth affairs 
Training, including New Apprenticeships and training services 
Co-ordination of research policy 
Research grants and fellowships

Structure
The Department was an Australian Public Service department, staffed by officials who were responsible to the Minister for Education, Training and Youth Affairs, David Kemp.

References

Ministries established in 1998
Education, Training and Youth Affairs
1998 establishments in Australia
2001 disestablishments in Australia